"Nenápadná" is a song by Marika Gombitová, released by OPUS in 1986.

The composition, written by Gombitová with Kamil Peteraj, was released with "Mami, mami" on the B-side. For the first time on CD, both songs were attached to the 96's re-release of the singer's album Ateliér duše as bonus tracks.

Official versions
 "Nenápadná" - Studio version, 1983

Credits and personnel
 Marika Gombitová - music, lead vocal
 Kamil Peteraj - lyrics
 OPUS - copyright

Charts

Weekly charts

Year-end charts

Notes
A  The October chart topped "Smrtka na pražskom Orloji" by Elán, followed by "Pigi čaj" by Zenit. In November, Gombitová's single charted also at number #3, behind "Keď ťa nechá dievča" by Zenit, respectively Elán's "Smrtka na pražskom Orloji" by Elán.
B  The Top 5 of the Slovak Year End Chart topped in 1987 "Že mi je ľúto" by Elán & Lojzo, followed by Peter Nagy's "Poďme sa zachrániť" (#2) and "Zaľúbení" by Dušan Hlaváček. The fourth was Gombitová, while at #5 "Smrtka na pražskom Orloji" by Elán.

References

General

Specific

External links 
 

1986 songs
1986 singles
Marika Gombitová songs
Songs written by Marika Gombitová
Songs written by Kamil Peteraj
Slovak-language songs